The Maxus V90 is a 2 to 18-seater light commercial van produced by Maxus. It was launched during the Shanghai Auto Show of 2019. The model was aimed to replace the Maxus V80. The vehicle is sold in multiple European markets as the Maxus Deliver 9, including an all-electric version known as the eDeliver 9.

Overview

In March 2019, news of the patent about the Chinese company Shanghai Automotive Industry Corporation (SAIC) launching a new commercial vehicle model called the V90 under the Maxus brand broke out, and the Maxus V90 was later launched during the 2019 Shanghai Auto Show.

Maxus was set up following its acquisition of the intellectual property of LDV in 2010, and the first model of Maxus is the predecessor of the V90, the V80, which is a rebadged LDV Maxus. The LDV Maxus model was relaunched by SAIC as the V80 in June 2011.

At launch, the price range of the Maxus V90 ranges from 150,000 yuan to 290,000 yuan. The Maxus V90 is equipped with a 2.0 liter turbo diesel engine producing 150 horsepower and 375 N-m and fulfilling the National Standard VI Emission standard of China.

Electric variant

A fully electric variant of the vehicle is sold in Europe, including the UK & Ireland, as the Maxus eDeliver 9. It is not to be confused with the smaller Maxus eDeliver 3.

There are multiple battery size options: 51.5 kWh, 72 kWh or 88.5 kWh.

Markets
In November 2022, the LDV eT60 and LDV eDeliver 9 were launched in Australia.

Powertrains

References

External links

SAIC Maxus website

V90
Vans
Electric vans
Cars introduced in 2019
Minibuses
Vehicles introduced in 2019
Cars of China